Syakir Sulaiman (born September 30, 1992) is an Indonesian footballer who plays as a attacking midfielder.

Club career
After some spells on several Indonesian Super League and Liga 1 clubs, he signed for the newly promoted club Aceh United for 2018 Liga 2 season. On May 13, 2018, he scored a hattrick when Aceh United played an away game versus Persita Tangerang.

International career
In 2014, Syakir Sulaiman represented the Indonesia U-23, in the 2014 Asian Games.

Honours

Individual honors
 Indonesia Super League Young player of the year: 2013

References

External links
 
 Syakir Sulaiman at Liga Indonesia

Indonesian footballers
1992 births
Living people
Acehnese people
Sportspeople from Aceh
Indonesian Premier League players
Liga 1 (Indonesia) players
Persiraja Banda Aceh players
Persiba Balikpapan players
Sriwijaya F.C. players
Footballers at the 2014 Asian Games
Indonesia youth international footballers
Association football midfielders
Bali United F.C. players
Asian Games competitors for Indonesia